The 2020–21 Korisliiga season was the 81st season of the top professional basketball league in Finland. Vilpas Vikings won its first-ever national championship.

Format 
The twelve teams would play two times against each one of the other teams for a total of 22 games. Then league splits into two groups (one with the first 6 teams and the other with the last 6 teams) and each team plays two games against each one of the teams from the same group (for a total of 10 games). The six teams from the first group and the best two teams from the second group would join the playoffs. The last team would be directly relegated.

Teams 

No teams promoted, nor relegated.

Regular season

References

External links 
 Official website
 League standings at RealGM.com
 League standings at Eurobasket.com

Korisliiga seasons
Finnish
Koris